Spirorhaphe (sometimes misspelt Spiroraphe) is an ichnogenus of spiraling burrows. It is associated with the Nereites ichnofacies, which is interpreted as an indicator of deep-sea, pelagic, turbidity current-dominated systems. It is one of the most common graphoglyptid traces found in modern ocean beds.

References

Trace fossils
Paleozoic life of Ontario
Paleozoic life of Manitoba
Paleozoic life of Quebec